Air Commodore Harcharan Singh Mangat MVC (6 June 1932 – ) was an ex-officer of the Indian Air Force, who participated in the Indo-Pakistani War of 1971 for which he was awarded the Maha Vir Chakra, India's second highest military award.

Early life
Air Commodore Harcharan Singh Mangat was born on 6 June 1932 in Ludhiana, India. His father's name was Shri Ram Singh Mangat.

Military career
During the Indo-Pakistani War of 1971 in the western sector, Wing Commander Harcharan Singh Mangat was commanding officer of the No. 32 Squadron IAF, an Operational Bomber Squadron, operating Sukhoi Su-7 aircraft. Wing Commander Harcharan Singh Mangat undertook a number of interdiction, close support missions and photographic reconnaissance missions, without fighter escort, deep into Pakistan territory. The information brought by him from the reconnaissance missions was used in the operational planning and success of Indian Army and the Indian Air Force operations.

For gallantry, professional skills and leadership of the high order, he was awarded India's second highest military award, the Maha Vir Chakra

He later rose to the rank of Air Commodore before retiring.

References

1932 births
Indian Air Force officers
Indian aviators
Pilots of the Indo-Pakistani War of 1965
Pilots of the Indo-Pakistani War of 1971
Indian military personnel of the Indo-Pakistani War of 1971
Recipients of the Maha Vir Chakra
Indian Sikhs
Living people